is a protected area located in Kagoshima Prefecture, Kyushu. It includes parts of the Ōsumi Islands with Yakushima, the entire island Kuchinoerabu-jima and some surrounding marine areas.

The national park was established on March 16, 1964 and assigned to the Kirishima National Park, which became Kirishima-Yaku National Park. On March 16, 2012 Yakushima was split of as the separate Yakushima National Park. Kirishima-Yaku National Park was renamed to Kirishima-Kinkōwan National Park with an area of 365.86 km².

Geography 
It is mainly on the west coast of the island. Kuchinoerabu-jima has  and belongs entirely to the National Park plus  of coastal waters.

The core area of the National Park is formed by the Okudake mountains. Some of the mountains are considered sacred places by the population, others can be climbed. Parts of the area are accessible by hiking trails.
The island has a humid subtropical climate zone with humid and hot summers and mild winters.

Yakushima
 Ōkawa Falls
 Oku-dake
 Mae-dake
 Nagata-hama
 Jōmon Sugi
 Kuchinoerabu-jima
 Mount Miyanoura

Nature and landscape 

In the national park are extensive stocks of cryptomeria and rhododendron. A  area with the oldest cedar trees, Yakusugi, whose age is estimated to be more than 2000 years, is not part of the national park. On 17 May 1975, the Hanayama district in the Yakushima mountainous was designated as the Yakushima Wilderness Area under special protection.

Parts of the national park, as well as the Yakushima Natural Reserve (107.47 km²), were declared by UNESCO World Heritage in 1993.

The national park has its own subspecies of the Japanese macaque (Macaca fuscata). The beach of Nagata-hama is visited by Hawksbill sea turtles to lay eggs.

At the southwestern end of the island is the Kurio Marine Park. It has coral reefs and correspondingly exotic wildlife. The landscape of the island Kuchinoerabu-jima is characterized by different volcanoes and dense forests. The endangered species of Ryukyu flying fox lives there.

Altogether, 1900 plant species, 16 mammal species and 150 bird species have been detected in the National Park thus far.

References

External links
 Map of Area 3 (Yakushima)

National parks of Japan